Wilhelm Schroeder (April 23, 1898 – July 8, 1943) was a German politician (NSDAP) and pilot. He was born in Leipzig.

Early life
After attending high school, Schroeder graduated in approximately 1920 to 1921 to an agricultural apprenticeship. From October 1914, Schroeder volunteered in the First World War. While he initially was in the infantry, he later became a pilot, in either 1917 or 1918. In 1916, he achieved the rank of lieutenant in the reserve. During the war, he was awarded the Iron Cross, in both classes. After the war, he attended high school in Dresden from 1919 to 1920. He then studied agriculture, economics, history, and art for a year in Munich. From 1923 through to 1932, Schroeder earned his living as Gutsinspektor. He married in 1927.

Political life 
In January 1923, Schroeder joined the National Socialist German Workers Party (NSDAP) in (Mitgliedsnr. 63,277). He was also a member of the Sturmabteilung (SA). After the temporary ban on the party from November 1923 to January 1925, he rejoined the Nazi party in 1926. In the following years, he held various party roles, including appearing as a party speaker in 1930. He was the local leader and agricultural Gau Fachberater. From 1932 to 1935 he served as the leader of the SA Standard 139.

In the July 1932 general election, Schroeder was a candidate of the NSDAP, for the constituency 29 (Leipzig) in the Reichstag of the Weimar Republic election. After his mandate in the next three elections - November 1932, March 1933 and November 1933 - was confirmed, Schroeder ran for the constituency 22 (Düsseldorf East) in the election of March 1936, which he retained until April 1938.  From April 1938 until his death in July 1943, he represented constituency 34 (Hamburg). Among the parliamentary events in which Schroeder was the vote on the Enabling Act in March 1933.

After the "seizure of power" by the Nazis in the spring of 1933, Schroeder was promoted to SA-Standartenführer. In 1934 he became a member of the State Farmers' Council of Saxony. On 12 February 1935, he joined the Schutzstaffel (SS) at (Mitgliedsnr. 261,293). From 6 May 1935 until 15 January 1937, he led the 20th SS Regiment (Düsseldorf). From 1 January 1937 until 20 May 1939, he was the leader of the SS Section XV (Dortmund). On 9 November 1937, he was promoted to SS Chief Leader.

On 1 June 1939, he was promoted to staff leader of the SS section Alpine country whose headquarters were in Salzburg. In 1943, he was appointed First Lieutenant of the Waffen-SS transport. According to the work of "The Big German Reichstag", Schroeder died in July 1943 during an anti-partisan action in Carinthia. A personal condolence letter by his commander F. Bochmann, dated 15 July 1943, states that Schroeder as of 8 July 1943, "west of the village Gouki has remained as head of the heavy tank company of our regiment from the enemy." Additionally, a newspaper clipping refers to the fact that Schroeder "is an SS Lieutenant leader and company commander in the SS-Panzer-Grenadier-Division 'Totenkopf' fallen in the ongoing heavy fighting in the East."

He died in battle on July 8, 1943, in Redin, Carinthia.

References

External links

Nazi Party politicians
1898 births
1943 deaths
Waffen-SS personnel killed in action
Military personnel from Leipzig
Recipients of the Iron Cross (1914), 1st class
German Army personnel of World War I
Sturmabteilung officers